Pyletown is an unincorporated community in Clarke County, Virginia. Pyletown lies to the northeast of Boyce on Pyletown Road (VA 620).

Unincorporated communities in Clarke County, Virginia
Unincorporated communities in Virginia